LIHKG is a multi-category forum website based in Hong Kong. The website has gained popularity since the launch in 2016, and is often referred to as the Hong Kong version of Reddit.

Threads with more up-votes and replies appear towards the top of topic sections and, if they receive sufficient votes and replies, they will ultimately be on the site's "Popular" section.

The website is well known for being one of the main platforms for discussing the strategies for the leaderless anti-extradition bill protests in 2019.

Background 
In 2016, HKG+, an 3rd party app of HKGolden was suspended by HKGolden. On 21 November 2016, the developer of HKG+ announced on their Facebook page that they have shared part of the source code of the app with another developers, 連尼住 and 望遠. Based on the source code, 連尼住 and 望遠 developed LIHKG.

Registration 
Registration of membership is restricted to people with a Hong Kong ISP or an institution of higher education email address located in Hong Kong. Registered members may create threads on the site, while uploading contents such as text posts, hyperlinks or images. The posts then receive replies and may be voted up or down by other members. Posts are separated into various categories and are then grouped in the "Chat" category.

Attacks 
In December 2019, the LIHKG website was subjected to a DDoS attack by the Great Cannon of China.

See also 
 Hong Kong Discuss Forum
 HKGolden Forum
2019–2020 Hong Kong protests

Notes

References

External links 
  

Internet forums in Hong Kong
Internet properties established in 2016
2016 establishments in Hong Kong